The 1961 AFL Championship Game was a rematch of the first American Football League title game, between the Houston Oilers and the San Diego Chargers (formerly the Los Angeles Chargers). It was played on December 24 at Balboa Stadium in San Diego, California, and the Oilers were three-point favorites.

Background
The game matched the Eastern Division champion Houston Oilers  against the Western Division champion San Diego Chargers  two of only three AFL teams with winning records in the 1961 season.  (The other was the Boston Patriots at

Game summary
The 1961 AFL championship game was the sixth meeting between the two teams during the calendar year. The previous season's title game, won by Houston 24–16, had been played on January 1, 1961. The Chargers had won two exhibition contests with the Oilers in the summer, and they had split during the regular season, with the home teams winning.

The second AFL title game kicked off at 1:30 pm PST and scoring was held down by sloppy play and turnovers: Houston had seven and San Diego six. The only score of the first half came on a 46-yard George Blanda field goal, coming after a nine-yard San Diego punt.

In the third quarter, the Oilers had the only sustained drive of the game, and went 80 yards. With a third-and-five at the San Diego 35, Blanda rolled to his right and found Billy Cannon open at the 17. Cannon jumped to make the catch, shrugged off a would-be tackler, and scampered into the end zone for a touchdown, his second in two straight low-scoring championship games. Blanda's extra point put Houston up 10–0. The Chargers scored early in the fourth quarter on a 12-yard field goal by George Blair, but they could not score again, and the Oilers won 10–3.

San Diego head coach Sid Gillman was involved in a heated post-game discussion at mid-field with an official, field judge John Morrow, who was wrestled to the ground by Charger safety Bob Zeman.

The game was not a sellout; the attendance of 29,556 was several thousand under Balboa Stadium's capacity.

See also
 1961 AFL season
 AFL Championship Games
 1961 NFL Championship Game

References

Houston Oilers postseason
San Diego Chargers postseason
American Football League Championship Game
Championship Game
American football in San Diego
American Football League Championship Game
American Football League Championship Game